The Medelpads Fotbollförbund (Medelpad Football Association) is one of the 24 district organisations of the Swedish Football Association. It administers lower tier  football in the historical province of Medelpad in Norrland.

It was established on 1 July 1933, when Västernorrland County Football Association was disbanded, and split into the Medelpad Football Association and the Ångermanland Football Association.

Background 

Medelpads Fotbollförbund, commonly referred to as Medelpads FF, is the governing body for football historical province of Medelpad, now within Västernorrland County. The Association currently has 46 member clubs.  Based in Sundsvall, the Association's Chairman is Magdalena Wallgren.

Affiliated members 

The following clubs are affiliated to the Medelpads FF:

Alby FF
Alnö BK
Alnö IF
Bybergets IK
Erikslunds SK
Essviks AIF
Fränsta IK
GIF Sundsvall
Granlo BK
Hassels IF
Heffnersklubbans BK
Heffners-Ortvikens IF
Holms SK
IFK Sundsvall
IFK Timrå
Indals IF
Kungsnäs FC
Kovlands IF
Kubikenborgs IF
Ljunga IF
Ljustorps IF
Lucksta IF
Matfors IF
Medskogsbrons BK
Naggens IK
Nedansjö IK
Njurunda IK
Njurunda SK
Selånger FK
Selånger FKU
Sidsjö-Böle IF
Söders BK
Söråkers FF
Stockviks FF
Stöde IF
Sund IF
Sundsvall Norra FF
Sundsvalls DFF
Sundsvalls FF
Sundsvalls FK
Svartviks IF
Team Heffners FF
Torpshammars IF
Västra United FC
Viskans IF
Ånge IF
Östavalls IF

League competitions 
Medelpads FF run the following League Competitions:

Men's football
Division 4  -  one section
Division 5  -  one section
Division 6  -  one section

Women's football
Division 3  -  one section
Division 4  -  one section

Footnotes

External links 
 Medelpads FF Official Website 

Medelpads
Football in Västernorrland County
1933 establishments in Sweden
Organizations established in 1933